Escape to Chimp Eden is a television series broadcast on the Animal Planet network that premiered on February 8, 2008. The series examines the rescue of abused and neglected chimpanzees.

History
In Escape to Chimp Eden, Eugene Cussons rescues and rehabilitates abused chimpanzees in South Africa. The Animal Planet show was created by Triosphere and Creative Differences.

Featured chimpanzees

Between Seasons 1 and 2, Abu and Guida died. Guida died in the episode The Rise and Fall of Guida due to syndrome, suffering complications from congestive heart failure. Abu's death was aired in the previous episode.

See also
Animal rights
Animal rescue (disambiguation)
Animal sanctuary
Animal welfare
Cruelty to animals

References

External links

TV Week: "Chimps Find Eden on Animal Planet". Jon Lafayette. January 16, 2008. Retrieved January 30, 2008.
 JGI Chimpanzee Eden website

Documentary films about nature
Animal Planet original programming
2008 American television series debuts
2009 American television series endings
Television shows about chimpanzees